Dreamer of Dune: The Biography of Frank Herbert is a 2003 biography of the American science fiction author Frank Herbert written by his son, Brian Herbert. It was a Hugo Award for Best Related Work finalist in 2004.

References

2003 non-fiction books
Books based on Dune (franchise)
English-language books
Works by Brian Herbert
Tor Books books